Anti-imperialism in political science and international relations is a term used in a variety of contexts, usually by nationalist movements who want to secede from a larger polity  (usually in the form of an empire, but also in a multi-ethnic sovereign state) or as a specific theory opposed to capitalism in Leninist discourse, derived from Vladimir Lenin's work Imperialism, the Highest Stage of Capitalism. Less common usage refers to opponents of an interventionist foreign policy.

People who categorize themselves as anti-imperialists often state that they are opposed to colonialism, colonial empires, hegemony, imperialism and the territorial expansion of a country beyond its established borders. An influential movement independent of the Western Left that advocated religious anti-imperialism was Pan-Islamism; which challenged the Western civilisational model and rose to prominence across various parts of the Islamic World during the 19th and 20th centuries. Its most influential ideologue was the Sunni theologian Muhammad Rashid Rida, a fierce opponent of Western ideas, who called upon Muslims to rise up in armed resistance by waging Jihad against imperialism. Through his resolution in the Second World Congress of Comintern (1920), Lenin accused the anti-imperialism of Pan-Islamists of favouring the interests of the bourgeoisie, feudal landlords and religious clerics; and enjoined fellow communists to compulsorily fight Pan-Islamism. Since then, Soviet authorities regularly employed the charge of Pan-Islamism to target Islamic dissidents for anti-Soviet activities and fomenting anti-communist rebellions.

The phrase gained a wide currency after the Second World War and at the onset of the Cold War as political movements in colonies of European powers promoted national sovereignty. Some anti-imperialist groups who opposed the United States supported the power of the Soviet Union, while in some Marxist schools, such as Maoism, this was criticized as social imperialism. Islamist movements traditionally view Russia and China as imperial and neo-colonial forces engaged in persecution and oppression of Muslim communities domestically and abroad, in addition to the U.S. and its allies like Israel.

Theory 

In the late 1870s, the term "imperialism" was introduced to the English language by opponents of the aggressively imperial policies of British Prime Minister Benjamin Disraeli (1874–1880). It was shortly appropriated by supporters of "imperialism" such as Joseph Chamberlain. For some, imperialism designated a policy of idealism and philanthropy; others alleged that it was characterized by political self-interest; and a growing number associated it with capitalist greed. John A. Hobson and Vladimir Lenin added a more theoretical macroeconomic connotation to the term. Many theoreticians on the left have followed either or both in emphasizing the structural or systemic character of "imperialism". Such writers have expanded the time period associated with the term so that it now designates neither a policy, nor a short space of decades in the late 19th century, but a global system extending over a period of centuries, often going back to Christopher Columbus. As the application of the term has expanded, its meaning has shifted along five distinct but often parallel axes: the moral, the economic, the systemic, the cultural and the temporal. Those changes reflect—among other shifts in sensibility—a growing unease with the fact of power, specifically Western power.

The relationships among capitalism, aristocracy and imperialism have been discussed and analysed by theoreticians, historians, political scientists such as John A. Hobson and Thorstein Veblen, Joseph Schumpeter and Norman Angell. Those intellectuals produced much of their works about imperialism before the World War I (1914–1918), yet their combined work informed the study of the impact of imperialism upon Europe and contributed to the political and ideologic reflections on the rise of the military–industrial complex in the United States from the 1950s onwards.

Hobson

John A. Hobson strongly influenced the anti-imperialism of both Marxists and liberals, worldwide through his 1902 book on Imperialism. He argued that the "taproot of imperialism" is not in nationalist pride, but in Capitalism. As a form of economic organization, imperialism is unnecessary and immoral, the result of the mis-distribution of wealth in a capitalist society. That created an irresistible desire to extend the national markets into foreign lands, in search of profits greater than those available in the Mother Country. In the capitalist economy, rich capitalists received a disproportionately higher income than did the working class. If the owners invested their incomes to their factories, the greatly increased productive capacity would exceed the growth in demand for the products and services of said factories. Lenin adopted Hobson's ideas to argue that capitalism was doomed and would eventually be replaced by socialism, the sooner the better.

Hobson was also influential in liberal circles, especially the British Liberal Party. Historians Peter Duignan and Lewis H. Gann argue that Hobson had an enormous influence in the early 20th century that caused widespread distrust of imperialism:

On the positive side, Hobson argued that domestic social reforms could cure the international disease of imperialism by removing its economic foundation. Hobson theorized that state intervention through taxation could boost broader consumption, create wealth and encourage a peaceful multilateral world order. Conversely, should the state not intervene, rentiers (people who earn income from property or securities) would generate socially negative wealth that fostered imperialism and protectionism.

Political movement 
As a self-conscious political movement, anti-imperialism originated in Europe in the late 19th and early 20th centuries in opposition to the growing European colonial empires and the United States control of the Philippines after 1898. However, it reached its highest level of popular support in the colonies themselves, where it formed the basis for a wide variety of national liberation movements during the mid-20th century and later. These movements, and their anti-imperialist ideas, were instrumental in the decolonization process of the 1950s and 1960s, which saw most European colonies in Asia and Africa achieving their independence.

International context

United States 
 
An early use of the term "anti-imperialist" occurred after the United States entered the Spanish–American War in 1898. Most activists supported the war itself, but opposed the annexation of new territory, especially the Philippines. The Anti-Imperialist League was founded on June 15, 1898, in Boston in opposition of the acquisition of the Philippines, which would happen anyway. The anti-imperialists opposed the expansion because they believed imperialism violated the credo of republicanism, especially the need for "consent of the governed". Appalled by American imperialism, the Anti-Imperialist League, which included famous citizens such as Andrew Carnegie, Henry James, William James and Mark Twain, formed a platform which stated:

Fred Harrington states that "the anti-imperialist's did not oppose expansion because of commercial, religious, constitutional, or humanitarian reasons but instead because they thought that an imperialist policy ran counter to the political doctrines of the Declaration of Independence, Washington's Farewell Address, and Lincoln's Gettysburg Address".

An important influence on American intellectuals was the work of British writer John A. Hobson. especially Imperialism: A Study (1902). Historians Peter Duignan and Lewis H. Gann argue that Hobson had an enormous influence in the early 20th century that caused widespread distrust of imperialism:

The American rejection of the League of Nations in 1919 was accompanied with a sharp American reaction against European imperialism. American textbooks denounced imperialism as a major cause of the World War. The uglier aspects of British colonial rule were emphasized, recalling the long-standing anti-British sentiments in the United States.

In Britain and Canada 
Anti-imperialism within Britain emerged in the 1890s, especially from within the Liberal Party. For over a century, back to the days of Adam Smith in 1776, economists had been hostile to imperialism on the grounds that it is a violation of the principles of free trade; they never formed a popular movement. Indeed, imperialism seems to have been generally popular before the 1890s. The key impetus around 1900 came from strong public disapproval with the British actions during with the Second Boer War (1899–1902). The war was fought against the Afrikaners, who were Dutch colonists who had built new homelands in South Africa. Opposition to the Second Boer War was modest when the war began and was generally less widespread than support for it. However, influential groups formed immediately against the war, including the South African Conciliation Committee and W. T. Stead's Stop the War Committee. Much of the opposition in Britain came from the Liberal Party. Intellectuals and activists Britain based in the socialist, labour and Fabian movements generally oppose imperialism and John A. Hobson, a Liberal, took many of his ideas from their writings. After the Boer war, opponents of imperialism turned their attention to the British crown colonies in Africa and Asia. By the 1920s, the government was sponsoring large-scale exhibits promoting imperialism, notably the 1924 British Empire Exhibition in London and the 1938 Glasgow Empire Exhibition. Some intellectuals used the opportunity to criticise imperialism as a policy.

Moderately active anti-imperial movements emerged in Canada and Australia. The French Canadians were hostile to British expansion whilst in Australia, it was the Irish Catholics who were opposed. French Canadians argue that Canadian nationalism was the proper and true goal and it sometimes conflicted with loyalty to the British Empire. Many French Canadians claimed that they would fight for Canada but would not fight for the Empire.

Protestant Canadians, typically of British descent, generally supported British imperialism enthusiastically. They sent thousands of volunteers to fight alongside British and imperial forces against the Boers and in the process identified themselves even more strongly with the British Empire. A little opposition also came from some English immigrants such as the intellectual leader Goldwin Smith. In Canada, the Irish Catholics were fighting the French Canadians for control of the Catholic Church, so the Irish generally supported the pro-British position. Anti-imperialism also grew rapidly in India and formed a core element of the demand by Congress for independence.

Marxism–Leninism 

In the mid-19th century, Karl Marx mentioned imperialism to be part of the prehistory of the capitalist mode of production in Das Kapital (1867–1894). Much more important was Vladimir Lenin, who defined imperialism as "the highest stage of capitalism", the economic stage in which monopoly finance capital becomes the dominant application of capital. As such, said financial and economic circumstances impelled national governments and private business corporations to worldwide competition for control of natural resources and human labour by means of colonialism.

The Leninist views of imperialism and related theories, such as dependency theory, address the economic dominance and exploitation of a country, rather than the military and the political dominance of a people, their country and its natural resources. Hence, the primary purpose of imperialism is economic exploitation, rather than mere control of either a country or of a region. The Marxist and the Leninist denotation thus differs from the usual political science denotation of imperialism as the direct control (intervention, occupation and rule) characteristic of colonial and neo-colonial empires as used in the realm of international relations.

In Imperialism, the Highest Stage of Capitalism (1917), Lenin outlined the five features of capitalist development that lead to imperialism:
 Concentration of production and capital leading to the dominance of national and multinational monopolies and cartels.
 Industrial capital as the dominant form of capital has been replaced by finance capital, with the industrial capitalists increasingly reliant on capital provided by monopolistic financial institutions. "Again and again, the final word in the development of banking is monopoly".
 The export of the aforementioned finance capital is emphasized over the export of goods.
 The economic division of the world by multinational cartels.
 The political division of the world into colonies by the great powers, in which the great powers monopolise investment.

Generally, the relationship among Marxist-Leninists and radical, left-wing organisations who are anti-war, often involves persuading such political activists to progress from pacifism to anti-imperialism—that is, to progress from the opposition of war, in general, to the condemnation of the capitalist economic system, in particular.

In the 20th century, the Soviet Union represented themselves as the foremost enemy of imperialism and thus politically and financially supported Third World revolutionary organisations who fought for national independence. This was accomplished through the export of both financial capital and Soviet military apparatuses, with the Soviet Union sending military advisors to Ethiopia, Angola, Egypt and Afghanistan.

However, anarchists as well as many other Marxist organizations, have characterized Soviet foreign policy as imperialism and cited it as evidence that the philosophy of Marxism would not resolve and eliminate imperialism. Mao Zedong developed the theory that the Soviet Union was a social imperialist nation, a socialist people with tendencies to imperialism, an important aspect of Maoist analysis of the history of the Soviet Union. Contemporarily, the term "anti-imperialism" is most commonly applied by Marxist-Leninists, and political organisations of like ideological persuasion who oppose capitalism, present a class analysis of society and the like.

About the nature of imperialism and how to oppose and defeat it, Che Guevara said:

Islamic anti-imperialism 

The 18th and 19th centuries witnessed the rise of numerous anti-colonial and anti-imperial Islamic resistance movements across various parts of the Muslim World. These included the Jihad movement led by the Imamate of Caucasus and the Circassian Confederacy against Russian imperialism during the Caucasus Wars (1763-1864 C.E). Prominent leaders in this resistance campaign included Ghazi Mullah, Gamzat-bek, Shamil, Hajji Qerandiqo Berzeg, Jembulat Boletoqo, etc. Other major anti-imperial movements included the Padri War, Java War, and the Aceh War against the Dutch colonisation of Indonesia, Moro Rebellion against the United States, the South Asian Jihad movement of Sayyid Ahmad Shahid, Mahdist State in Sudan and the Arabian Muwahhidun that fought British colonialism, Emir Abd al-Qadir's military insurgency against French in Algeria, Omar Mukhtar's Jihad against Italian Fascists in Libya, etc. The establishment and defense of Islamic statehood that enforces Sharia (Islamic law) based on Qur'an and Sunnah, elimination of superstitions and heterodox local practices and folk rituals, etc. were key objectives of these reform movements.

These anti-colonial movements inspired the rise of Pan-Islamism during the late 19th century; which gave birth to numerous Islamist organisations advocating anti-imperialism across the Muslim World; such as the Muslim Brotherhood (Ikhwan al-Muslimeen) and Jamaat-e-Islami. Syro-Egyptian Islamist theoretician Muhammad Rashid Rida (1865 C.E/1282 A.H- 1935 C.E/1354 A.H), a Salafi theologian greatly influenced by preceding militant Islamic revivalist movements, was an ardent opponent of European imperial powers; and he called for armed Jihad to defend the Islamic World from encroaching colonialism, complemented by a political programme to establish Islamic states which would implement Sharia (Islamic laws). He extended this anti-imperialist campaign to the theological level through the Arab Salafiyya movement; which professed the key theme of returning to the values of Salaf al-Salih. This encompassed a theological assault on Western ideological currents emanating from the principles of secularism and nationalism as well as denunciation of Western cultural imperialism.

After Rashid Rida, the mantle of Islamist anti-imperialism was spearheaded by the Egyptian Muslim Brotherhood founder Hasan al-Banna, South Asian revolutionary Islamist leader Sayyid Abul A'la Maududi and Egyptian Jihadist theoretician Sayyid Qutb. Mawdudi held the belief that West was in decline and that restoration of Islamic prowess was inevitable. Openly equating Western colonialism with atheism, Mawdudi called upon Muslims to rally in Jihad against the imperialist forces to regain their spiritual, cultural, economic and military sovereignty and self-sufficiency. Sayyid Qutb, an Egyptian scholar influenced by both Mawdudi and Rashid Rida, took their ideas to its logical culmination; proclaiming the necessity of a permanent, un-ending Islamist revolution not only against the imperialists but also its allied regimes in the Muslim World. This revolution against the apostate regimes has to be waged as an armed Jihad by an ideological vanguard committed to establish the Islamic state and uphold Tawhid (Islamic monotheism). These ideas gained prominence and arose in influence across the Islamic World during the post World War 2 era. During the Cold War period, the Islamist intellectuals from the Muslim Brotherhood and Jamaat-e Islami also launched fervent anti-communist campaigns, ideologically critiquing socialism and Marxism and chiding leftists as agents of Soviet Imperialism.

In his book "Al Jihad Fil Islam", South Asian revolutionary Islamist scholar Abul A'la Mawdudi made a comprehensive Islamic refutation of imperialism. He argued that oppressive rulers justify imperialism in the name of progress and socio-political reforms. Describing the main features of imperialism, Mawdudi wrote:

The Indian Jamaat-e-Islami Hind launched a ten-day nationwide campaign titled Anti-Imperialism Campaign in December 2009. Contemporary Jihadist movements such as Al-Qaeda, influenced by Sayyid Qutb's thought, declares itself as a "global revolutionary vanguard" waging Jihad to defend Muslims from atrocities committed by the forces of Western imperialism and its allies.

In the worldview of Egyptian Jihadist theoretician Sayyid Qutb, imperialist policies of the secular Western regimes were a continuation of their historical "Crusading Spirit". In his commentary of the Qur'anic verse 2:120 "{Never will the Jews be pleased with you, (O Prophet), nor the Christians until you follow their way..}", Sayyid Qutb writes:

Liberal anti-imperialism 
Sometimes liberals also oppose imperialism. However, liberal anti-imperialists are distinct from socialist anti-imperialists because they are not support anti-capitalism or protectionism.

South Korean liberals have opposed Chinese and Japanese imperialism. "No Japan Movement" is related to anti-imperialist sentiment in South Korea. On August 14, 2019, seven politicians of the DPK's descendants of independence activists said at a press conference, "In the spirit of Great Korean Independence 100 years ago, let's overcome the economic invasion of Shinzo Abe's government." (100년 전 대한독립의 정신으로 아베 정부 경제침략을 이겨내자.) South Korean liberals, unlike protectionist anti-imperialists, believing that the Japanese government's actions that undermined the "free trade principle" (자유무역 원칙 or 자유무역 철칙) during the Japan–South Korea trade dispute were far-right imperialist 'economic invasion'. (South Korean liberals argue that the Japanese government caused unfair damage to the South Korean economy to avoid compensation for Korean victims of Japanese war crimes during the past imperialist Japan.)

Some modern liberals in the United States, including Dennis Kucinich, support non-interventionism.

Criticism 
Antonio Negri and Michael Hardt assert that traditional anti-imperialism is no longer relevant. In the book Empire, Negri and Hardt argue that imperialism is no longer the practice or domain of any one nation or state. Rather, they claim, the "Empire" is a conglomeration of all states, nations, corporations, media, popular and intellectual culture and so forth; and thus, traditional anti-imperialist methods and strategies can no longer be applied against them.

See also 

 Anti-Americanism
 Anti-British sentiment
 Anti-French sentiment
 Antimilitarism
 Anti-Western sentiment
 Colonialism
 Decentralization
 Historiography of the British Empire
 Internationalism (politics)
 Korean nationalism
 Anti-Chinese sentiment in Korea
 Anti-Japanese sentiment in Korea
 League against Imperialism
 Left-wing nationalism
 Localism (politics)
 National liberation wars
 National self-determination
 Postcolonialism

References

Bibliography 

 Griffiths, Martin, and Terry O'Callaghan, and Steven C. Roach 2008. International Relations: The Key Concepts. Second Edition. New Millan.
 Harrington, Fred H. "The Anti-Imperialist Movement in the United States, 1898-1900", Mississippi Valley Historical Review, Vol. 22, No. 2 (Sep., 1935), pp. 211–230 in JSTOR .
 Proudman, Mark F.. "Words for Scholars: The Semantics of 'Imperialism'". Journal of the Historical Society, September 2008, Vol. 8 Issue 3, p395-433.

Further reading 
 Ali, Tariq et al. Anti-Imperialism: A Guide for the Movement .
 Boittin, Jennifer Anne. Colonial Metropolis: The Urban Grounds of Anti-Imperialism and Feminism in Interwar Paris (2010).
 Brendon, Piers. "A Moral Audit of the British Empire." History Today, (Oct 2007), Vol. 57 Issue 10, pp 44–47, online at EBSCO.
 Brendon, Piers. The Decline and Fall of the British Empire, 1781-1997 (2008) excerpt and text search .
 Cain, P. J. and A.G. Hopkins. British Imperialism, 1688-2000 (2nd ed. 2001), 739pp, detailed economic history that presents the new "gentlemanly capitalists" thesis excerpt and text search .
 Castro, Daniel, Walter D.Mignolo, and Irene Silverblatt. Another Face of Empire: Bartolomé de Las Casas, Indigenous Rights, and Ecclesiastical Imperialism (2007) excerpt and text search , Spanish colonies.
 Cullinane, Michael Patrick. Liberty and American Anti-Imperialism, 1898-1909. New York: Palgrave Macmillan, 2012.
 Ferguson, Niall. Empire: The Rise and Demise of the British World Order and the Lessons for Global Power (2002), excerpt and text search .
 Friedman, Jeremy, and Peter Rutland. "Anti-imperialism: The Leninist Legacy and the Fate of World Revolution." Slavic Review 76.3 (2017): 591–599.
 Hamilton, Richard. President McKinley, War, and Empire (2006).
 Hardt, Michael, and Antonio Negri. Empire (2001), influential statement from the left.
 Herman, Arthur. Gandhi & Churchill: The Epic Rivalry that Destroyed an Empire and Forged Our Age (2009) [excerpt and text search].
 Hobson, J.A. Imperialism: A Study (1905) except and text search 2010 edition .
 James, Lawrence. The Rise and Fall of the British Empire (1997).
 Karsh, Efraim. Islamic Imperialism: A History (2007) excerpt and text search .
 Ness, Immanuel, and Zak Cope, eds. The Palgrave encyclopedia of imperialism and anti-imperialism (2 vol. 2016). 1456pp
 Olson, James S. et al., eds. Historical Dictionary of European Imperialism (1991) online edition .
 Owen, Nicholas. The British Left and India: Metropolitan Anti-Imperialism, 1885-1947 (2008) excerpt and text search .
 Polsgrove, Carol. Ending British Rule in Africa: Writers in a Common Cause (2009).
 Porter, Bernard. The Lion's Share: A History of British Imperialism 1850-2011 (4th ed. 2012), Wide-ranging general history; strong on anti-imperialism.
 Sagromoso, Domitilla, James Gow, and Rachel Kerr. Russian Imperialism Revisited: Neo-Empire, State Interests and Hegemonic Power (2010).
 Thornton, A.P. The Imperial Idea and its Enemies (2nd ed. 1985)
 Tompkins, E. Berkeley, ed. Anti-Imperialism in the United States: The Great Debate, 1890—1920. (1970) excerpts from primary and secondary sources.
 Tyrell, Ian and Jay Sexton, eds. Empire's Twin: U.S. anti-imperialism from the founding era to the age of terrorism (2015).
 Wang, Jianwei. "The Chinese interpretation of the concept of imperialism in the anti-imperialist context of the 1920s.," Journal of Modern Chinese History (2012) 6#2 pp 164–181.

External links
 The Anti-Imperialists, A Web based guide to American Anti-Imperialism.
 CWIHP at the Wilson Center for Scholars: Primary Document Collection on Anti-Imperialism in the Cold War.
 Pacific Northwest Antiwar and Radical History Project, multimedia collection of photographs, video, oral histories and essays.
 Imperialism: The Highest Stage of Capitalism by V.I. Lenin Full text at marxists.org.
 How Imperialist 'Aid' Blocks Development in Africa by Thomas Sankara, The Militant, April 13, 2009.
 Daniel Jakopovich, In the Belly of the Beast: Challenging US Imperialism and the Politics of the Offensive.
 The M and S Collection at the Library of Congress contains materials on anti-imperialism.

 
Anti-war movement
History of social movements

sv:Imperialism#Antiimperialism